Joseph de Agulló - Pinos ( 1670–1704) was a Catalan nobleman, Lord and Marquess of Gironella.

Biography 

In 1702 Joseph de Agulló was appointed Governor and Captain general of Ceuta. General Agulló, crushed the resistance of the Moors, who he overcame in a battle which occurred at Ceuta on May 18, 1703, with the command of 1500 men of infantry and 160 horses. His wife was María Francisca de Sagarriga y de Lapuente Marquise of Gironella.

References 

1670s births
1704 deaths
Military personnel from Catalonia
Catalan nobility